Jocelyn Robichaud  (born 8 April 1978 in Joliette, Quebec) is a former tour professional tennis player. Robichaud captured three junior Grand Slam titles and played Davis Cup for Canada. More of a doubles specialist, he won three Challenger events in doubles and reached a career-high ATP doubles ranking of World No. 119.

Junior tennis

Robichaud won his first of three Grand Slams in doubles partnering Jong-min Lee, as the tandem defeated the Dutch duo of Raemon Sluiter and Peter Wessels in the final of the 1995 U.S. Open, 7–6, 6–2.  After winning the Victorian Junior Championships and Australian Hardcourt Junior Championship, Robichaud and partner Daniele Bracciali captured the 1996 Australian Open junior title, defeating Bob and Mike Bryan in the final, 3–6, 6–3, 6–3.  Robichaud partnered Martin Verkerk at the next major and the pair reached the semi-finals of the 1996 French Open.  He rejoined Bracciali to win his third junior slam as the duo captured the 1996 Wimbledon Championship by dispensing of the South African pair of Damien Roberts and Wesley Whitehouse in the final, 6–3, 7–6.  Bracciali and Robichaud nearly made it a third Grand Slam title together but fell in the final of the 1996 U.S. Open to the Bryan twins, 7–5, 3–6, 4–6.  Robichaud reached an ITF junior doubles ranking of World No. 1, in December, 1995.

In singles, Robichaud's best results were reaching the third round of the 1995 Australian Open, the quarter-finals of the junior 1995 Italian Open, and the third round of the 1996 Wimbledon Championship.  His career-high ITF Junior singles ranking was World No. 11, which he reached in December, 1995.

Senior tennis

Rochichaud captured the Aptos Challenger twice in succession – in 1996 and 1997 – both times partnering fellow Québécois Sébastien Leblanc. His third Challenger title was winning the 1999 drkoop.com USTA Challenger of Miami, partnering Miles Wakefield. In addition, Robichaud captured an additional 5 ITF Futures tennis event titles. His career (main draw) match win–loss doubles record at Challenger level was 43 and 33, while at ATP Tour and Grand Slam level it was 6 wins, 15 losses.  His best top-flight result were reaching the quarter-finals of the 1997 Canadian Open, partnering Tommy Haas. In fact, all 6 of his ATP Tour match wins occurred at his home country's major tournament. Rochibaud appeared in the main draw of a Grand Slam event twice as a senior, both times in doubles, at the 2000 French Open, partnering Jack Waite, and Wimbledon, with Michael Sell. He and Waite lost in straight sets while he and Sell lost 8–10 in the fifth set to Marc-Kevin Goellner and Jan Siemerink.

As for singles, the highlights of Rochibaud's time on tour were winning his first senior-level match, at age 18, to World No. 627 Sergio Gómez-Barrio 6–3, 6–4 while taking Quebec tennis star and World No. 160 Sébastien Lareau in his second match to a second set tie-break, at the 1994 Montebello Challenger; reaching the final of Canada F1 in June, 1998 followed by the semi-final of Canada F2 the following week; reaching the final of Greece F2 in May, 2001; and reaching the semi-final of Canada F3, in June, 2001.  The sole ATP Tour event he competed in over the years, in a main draw, was the Canadian Open, in which he made 3 appearances, going 0 and 3.  In Challengers, he had 1 match win (the one over Gómez-Barrio) and 7 defeats, including going 0–5 at the Granby Challenger, while in Futures events he had a winning record of 39 and 33.  His career-high singles ATP ranking was World No. 384, which he reached in October, 1997.

Davis Cup

Robichaud appeared in rubbers in 4 Canadian Davis Cup ties, all of which Canada lost.  He got his first match action winning a dead singles rubber in a tie lost away to Ecuador, 2–3, in April 1998 American Group I semifinal action.  He defeated a young Giovanni Lapentti 6–3, 7–6(2).  In February 1999, in the quarter-finals of American Group I, Robichaud won his second Davis Cup match, teaming with star Canadian doubles player Daniel Nestor to defeat the Colombian duo of Mauricio Hadad and Miguel Tobon 7–6(5), 6–7(4), 6–7(3), 6–0, 6–4.  Canada lost this away tie too, 2–3.

The following year, Canada again faced a South American opponent away in the zonal group I quarter-finals and lost, this time to Chile, 1–4.  Robichaud again played the doubles tie, this time partnering Sébastien Lareau – they lost to Fernando González and Nicolás Massú, 4–6, 4–6, 6–2, 2–6.  Then his fourth and final Davis Cup rubber was a doubles lose with Fred Niemeyer, to the Argentine Davis Cup team of Agustín Calleri and Mariano Puerta, 6–7(5), 3–6, 4–6, in a 2001 American Group I semifinal match-up.

Post-playing career
In 2008, Robichaud captained Canada's youth Davis Cup team, and was a youth coach for Tennis Canada at its national training centre at Uniprix Stadium.

Junior Grand Slam finals

Doubles: 4 (3 titles, 1 runner-up)

ATP Challenger and ITF Futures finals

Singles: 2 (0–2)

Doubles: 14 (8–6)

References

Sources
ITF Junior profile page
ITF Junior activity page (adjust filter to between 1993 and 1997)
 
 

1978 births
Living people
Australian Open (tennis) junior champions
Canadian male tennis players
French Quebecers
People from Joliette
Racket sportspeople from Quebec
US Open (tennis) junior champions
Wimbledon junior champions
Grand Slam (tennis) champions in boys' doubles